The mixed doubles tournament of the 2007 European Junior Badminton Championships was held from 4 to 8 April 2007. Rasmus Bonde and Christinna Pedersen from Denmark clinched this title in the last edition.

Seeds 

  Mads Pieler Kolding / Line Damkjær Kruse (semi-finals)
  Chris Adcock / Gabrielle White (second round)
  Thomas Bethell / Jillie Cooper (quarter-finals)
  Lester Oey / Samantha Barning (third round)
  Jakub Bitman / Kristína Ludíková (second round)
  Mikkel Elbjørn / Maja Bech (semi-finals)
  Peter Käsbauer / Julia Schmidt (final)
  Peter Mills / Mariana Agathangelou (quarter-finals)

  Laurent Constantin / Émilie Lefel (third round)
  Hasan Hüseyin Durakcan / Ezgi Epice (first round)
  Zvonimir Đurkinjak / Staša Poznanović (third round)
  Marcus Ellis / Samantha Ward (quarter-finals)
  Nikita Khakimov / Victoria Ushkova (first round)
  Maciej Kowalik / Marlena Flis (third round)
  Christian Larsen / Joan Christiansen (champions)
  Dmytro Zavadsky / Mariya Martynenko (third round)

Draw

Finals

Top half

Section 1

Section 2

Bottom half

Section 3

Section 4

References

External links 
Tournament Link

2007 European Junior Badminton Championships